The 2019 Superclásico de las Américas – Copa Doctor Nicolás Leoz was the sixth edition of the Superclásico de las Américas. The match was played at the King Saud University Stadium in Riyadh, Saudi Arabia. 

Argentina won the game 1–0 with a goal from Lionel Messi; Messi's penalty was saved by Brazilian goalkeeper Alisson, but he scored on the rebound.

Match

Details 

|style="vertical-align:top; width:50%"|

|}

References

Superclásico de las Américas
Argentina national football team matches
Brazil national football team matches
Argentina–Brazil football rivalry
Superclásico de las Américas
International association football competitions hosted by Saudi Arabia
Superclásico de las Américas
Superclásico de las Américas